19th Congress may refer to
 19th Congress of the Communist Party of the Soviet Union (1952)
 19th Congress of the Philippines (2022–present)
 19th National Congress of the Chinese Communist Party (2017)
 19th National Congress of the Kuomintang (2013)
 19th United States Congress (1825–1827)